Spell House may refer to:

Spell House (Titusville, Florida), listed on the NRHP in Florida
Spell House (Keachi, Louisiana), listed on the NRHP in Louisiana